Jeremy Alexander Rothwell Brudenell (born 2 April 1960) is a retired British actor of the 1980s and 1990s.

Early life
Jeremy Alexander Rothwell Brudenell was born in Hammersmith, London on 2 April 1960, the second son of physician John Michael Brudenell (1925-2015) and Mollie, née Rothwell.

Acting career
He appeared as James Steerforth in David Copperfield (1986), Charles Warden in Fortunes of War (1987), Louis Bonaparte in Napoleon and Josephine: A Love Story (1987), Jean-Louis in Wish Me Luck (1990), Sebastian Pearce in The House of Eliott (1991), Ken Bernhard  in The Bill (1993), Robert de Valicourt/Nicholas Ward in Highlander: The Series (1994–96), Bill Truscott in A Dance to the Music of Time (1997), Thaddeus Arnold in The Enid Blyton Secret Series (1997–98), and Father in Alice in Wonderland (1999). He also appeared in Massacre Play, a 1989 Italian thriller-drama film.

Brudenell's stage roles include Time and the Conways at the Churchill Theatre in Bromley (1988–89), The Circle at the Theatre Royal, Bath (1989–90), Venus Observed at the Chichester Festival Theatre (1991–92), Paul in Double Take at the Chichester Festival Theatre and the Minerva Theatre, Chichester (1992), and Edmund in King Lear at the Young Vic (1997).

Later life
After professionally retiring from acting in 1999 Brudenell began a business career, and opened the 'Root One Garden Centre' in Wallingford, Oxfordshire.

Personal life
Brudenell married the model Edwina Hicks, the granddaughter of Lord Mountbatten of Burma, on 24 March 1984 at Christ Church Cathedral, Oxford, Oxfordshire, England. The couple had a son and two daughters before their divorce in 2004. The family were guests at the state funeral of Queen Elizabeth II on 19 September 2022.

References

External links

Brudenell on the British Film Institute website
Root One Garden Centre website

1960 births
Living people
English male television actors
English male film actors
English male stage actors
Male actors from London
People from Hammersmith
20th-century English male actors
21st-century English male actors